Aistis Pilauskas (born 8 April 1998) is a Lithuanian professional basketball player for BC Telšiai of the National Basketball League (NKL).

Professional career
On 16 September 2015, Aistis Pilauskas signed a contract with Lietuvos rytas and started to play for Lietuvos rytas development team Perlas-MRU Vilnius in the NKL. In first season in Perlas-MRU Vilnius, he averaged 6.5 points per game and 2.1 assist per game. On 13 April 2016, he made a debut against Vytautas Prienai–Birštonas by scoring 5 points.

National team career
Pilauskas made his debut for the junior national team of Lithuania in the 2015 FIBA Europe Under-18 Championship in Greece. He averaged 5.3 points, 2.1 assist in 16.5 minutes of action. His team won bronze medals.

References

External links
 Aistis Pilauskas at fiba.com

1998 births
Living people
Lithuanian men's basketball players
Basketball players from Vilnius
BC Rytas players
Point guards